Luc Louves (born February 22, 1989, in Pau, France) is a French basketball player who played 19 games for French Pro A league club Orleans from 2007 to 2009.

References

French men's basketball players
1989 births
Living people
Sportspeople from Pau, Pyrénées-Atlantiques
21st-century French people